Murder on the Orient Express is a 1934 detective novel by Agatha Christie. It may also refer to various adaptations of the novel:

Film
 Murder on the Orient Express (1974 film), film based on the novel, directed by Sidney Lumet, starring Albert Finney
 Murder on the Orient Express (2017 film), film based on the novel, directed by and starring Kenneth Branagh

Television
 "Murder on the Orient Express" (11 July 2010), an episode in British TV series Agatha Christie's Poirot, starring David Suchet
 "Whodunit?" (11-12 January 2015), a two-part TV series by Fuji Television to celebrate its 55th anniversary
 Murder on the Orient Express (2001 film), a film made for television based on the novel, starring Alfred Molina
 Mummy on the Orient Express an episode of Doctor Who

Other media
Murder on the Orient Express (28 December 1992 - 1 January 1993), a BBC Radio 4 adaptation starring John Moffatt as Poirot
 Agatha Christie: Murder on the Orient Express (2006), a PC game based on the novel

See also
 Orient Express, the train service 
 Stamboul Train (1932), a Graham Greene novel published in the United States as Orient Express (unrelated to the Agatha Christie novel)